The first-year player draft, also known as the Rule 4 Draft, is the primary mechanism for assigning amateur baseball players from high schools, colleges, and other amateur baseball clubs to Major League Baseball (MLB) teams. Unlike most professional sports, MLB does not permit the trading of draft picks, so the draft order is solely determined by the previous season's standings; the team that possesses the worst record receives the first pick. If two teams have identical records, the team with the worse record in the previous season will receive the higher pick. In addition, teams that lost free agents in the previous off-season may be awarded "compensatory" picks. The first draft took place in 1965; it was introduced to prevent richer teams from negotiating wealthier contracts with top-level prospects and therefore, monopolizing the player market. Originally, three drafts were held each year. The first draft took place in June and involved high-school graduates and college seniors who had just finished their seasons. The second draft took place in January for high school and college players who had graduated in December. The third draft took place in August and was for players who participated in American amateur summer leagues. The August draft was eliminated after two years, and the January draft lasted until 1986.

In 1965, Rick Monday became MLB's first draft pick after being selected by the Kansas City Athletics. Jackson Holliday is the most recent first overall pick; he was drafted by the Baltimore Orioles in 2022. Overall, 23 of the 50 picks before 2015 have participated in the All-Star Game, and four (Bob Horner, Darryl Strawberry, Bryce Harper, and Carlos Correa) have won the Rookie of the Year Award. Twenty-five of the fifty picks before 2015 have been drafted from high schools, one has been drafted out of the Independent American Association, and the others were drafted from universities. To date, Arizona State University and Vanderbilt University are the only schools from which multiple number-one overall draft picks have been chosen. No first overall pick was inducted into the National Baseball Hall of Fame until 2016, when Ken Griffey Jr. was inducted with a record 99.3 percent of votes cast. Griffey has since been joined by two other top picks: Chipper Jones, inducted in 2018; and Harold Baines, elected in December 2018 and inducted in July 2019.

In the 58 drafts that have taken place through 2022, 22 of the 30 MLB franchises have had the first pick at least once. The Toronto Blue Jays, St. Louis Cardinals, Los Angeles Dodgers, San Francisco Giants, Cleveland Guardians, Cincinnati Reds, Boston Red Sox, and Colorado Rockies have never had the first pick. The Montreal Expos never had the first pick, but the Nationals, their successor, have had it twice. The Oakland Athletics have never had the first pick, but the Kansas City Athletics, their predecessor, had the first pick in MLB draft history. The New York Mets, San Diego Padres, Houston Astros, and Pittsburgh Pirates have each had the first pick five times, and the Seattle Mariners and Tampa Bay Rays have each had the first pick four times.

Key

First overall picks

By franchise

Footnotes
 Goodwin chose to attend university instead of signing with the Chicago White Sox, and re-entered the draft once he graduated in 1975.
 Hochevar played college baseball for the University of Tennessee, and was originally drafted by the Los Angeles Dodgers in 2005, but did not agree to a contract. He re-entered the draft in 2006 after spending the previous year with the independent Fort Worth Cats.

See also

 List of first overall NBA draft picks
 List of first overall National Football League draft picks
 List of first overall NHL draft picks

References
General

Specific